Chewing Hides The Sound was Snakefinger's first full-length album, released by Ralph Records in 1979.  The record is co-produced with The Residents, who also co-wrote many of the songs.  The album has the distinction of featuring the first recorded cover version of Kraftwerk's song "The Model", it also features the cover of "Magic and Ecstasy" by Ennio Morricone from the soundtrack of Exorcist II: The Heretic.

Track listing
 "The Model"
 "Kill the Great Raven"
 "Jesus Was a Leprechaun"
 "Here Come the Bums"
 "The Vivian Girls"
 "Magic and Ecstasy"
 "Who Is the Culprit and Who Is the Victim?"
 "What Wilbur?"
 "Picnic in the Jungle"
 "Friendly Warning"
 "I Love Mary"
 "The Vultures of Bombay"

Personnel 
Performance: Snakefinger

Soprano Saxophone: Steven Brown

Bass: Phil Culp

Percussion: Don Jackovich

References 

1979 albums
Ralph Records albums
Snakefinger albums